Dmitry Alekseyevich Loginov (born 2 February 2000) is a Russian snowboarder. He is a three-time world champion and a sevenfold junior world champion.

Career
Loginov was born in Divnogorsk, Krasnoyarsk Krai to a weightlifter and a female volleyball player. He had practised karate before switching to snowboarding when he was 10 or 11 years old. It was in the elementary school where he was discovered by future coach Aleksey Derevyagin.  At the age of 15 he debuted in international competitions.

Loginov won his first championships title at the FIS Freestyle Ski and Snowboarding World Championships 2019 in Utah in parallel giant slalom. He won another gold medal in parallel slalom, the first ever gold medal in that event for Russia. To date, Loginov is the only snowboarder to win back-to-back events (parallel slalom and parallel giant slalom) in both junior and senior championships. He also became just the third snowboarder winning back-to-back titles in a World Championships.

World cup podiums

Individual podiums
  3 wins – (1 PS, 2 PGS)
  8 podiums – (4 PS, 4 PGS)

Team podiums
  1 podium – (1 PSLM )

References

External links

2000 births
Living people
Russian male snowboarders
Olympic snowboarders of Russia
Snowboarders at the 2018 Winter Olympics
Snowboarders at the 2022 Winter Olympics
Sportspeople from Krasnoyarsk Krai
People from Krasnoyarsk Krai